Helsingborgs IF had a resurgence season on the domestic scene, finishing in the top four once again. With Henrik Larsson having his best season following his return, the side was able to compensate for the loss of Razak Omotoyossi to Saudi Arabia. The 4th place finish meant Helsingborg qualified for Europe once more.

The year started with a defeat to PSV Eindhoven in the Last 32 of the UEFA Cup, the best performance from a Swedish club for some time. For results of the run see the 2007 article.

Squad

Goalkeepers
  Daniel Andersson
  Oscar Berglund

Defenders
  Adama Tamboura
  Andreas Landgren
  Samir Beloufa
  Christoffer Andersson
  Erik Wahlstedt
  Marcus Nilsson
  Oskar Rönningberg
  Joel Ekstrand
  Andreas Granqvist

Midfielders
  Isaac Chansa
  Hannu Patronen
  Fredrik Svanbäck
  Marcus Lantz
  Ólafur Ingi Skúlason
  René Makondele
  Mathias Unkuri
  Martin Kolář

Attackers
  Roman Kienast
  Razak Omotoyossi
  Henrik Larsson
  Rasmus Jönsson
  Mike Sserumaga

Allsvenskan

Matches

 GIF Sundsvall-Helsingborg 0-3
 0-1 Isaac Chansa 
 0-2 Christoffer Andersson 
 0-3 Christoffer Andersson 
 Helsingborg-Halmstad 1-1
 1-0 René Makondele 
 1-1 Martin Fribrock 
 Ljungskile-Helsingborg 0-2
 0-1 Andreas Granqvist 
 0-2 Henrik Larsson 
 Helsingborg-Gefle 2-2
 1-0 Christoffer Andersson 
 1-1 Hans Berggren 
 2-1 Isaac Chansa 
 2-2 Amadou Jawo 
 Hammarby-Helsingborg 2-1
 1-0 Paulinho Guará 
 2-0 Petter Andersson 
 2-1 Razak Omotoyossi 
 Helsingborg-IFK Norrköping 2-2
 0-1 Marcin Burkhardt 
 1-1 Henrik Larsson 
 2-1 Anders Whass 
 2-2 Kristoffer Arvhage 
 Kalmar FF-Helsingborg 4-2
 1-0 Patrik Ingelsten 
 2-0 Viktor Elm 
 2-1 Christoffer Andersson 
 3-1 David Elm 
 3-2 Marcus Lindberg 
 4-2 Viktor Elm 
 Helsingborg-Malmö FF 4-2
 1-0 Razak Omotoyossi 
 1-1 Jonatan Johansson 
 2-1 Henrik Larsson 
 3-1 Henrik Larsson 
 3-2 Jonatan Johansson 
 4-2 Marcus Lantz 
 Elfsborg-Helsingborg 1-0
 1-0 Daniel Mobaeck 
 Helsingborg-Örebro 1-0
 1-0 Henrik Larsson 
 Trelleborg-Helsingborg 1-3
 0-1 Henrik Larsson 
 1-1 Andreas Drugge 
 1-2 René Makondele 
 1-3 Marcus Lantz 
 Helsingborg-GAIS 1-0
 1-0 René Makondele 
 IFK Göteborg-Helsingborg 1-1
 1-0 Jonas Wallerstedt 
 1-1 Christoffer Andersson 
 Helsingborg-AIK 2-1
 0-1 Miran Burgič 
 1-1 Christoffer Andersson 
 2-1 Henrik Larsson 
 Helsingborg-Djurgården 2-0
 1-0 Christoffer Andersson 
 2-0 René Makondele 
 Djurgården-Helsingborg 1-2
 1-0 Johan Oremo 
 1-1 Isaac Chansa 
 1-2 Andreas Landgren 
 Helsingborg-GIF Sundsvall 2-1
 1-0 René Makondele 
 1-1 Ari Freyr Skúlason 
 2-1 Marcus Lantz 
 Halmstad-Helsingborg 3-1
 1-0 Ajsel Kujović 
 2-0 Michael Görlitz 
 3-0 Anselmo 
 3-1 Henrik Larsson 
 Helsingborg-Ljungskile 0-1
 0-1 Daryl Smylie 
 Gefle-Helsingborg 3-0
 1-0 Hans Berggren 
 2-0 Mathias Woxlin 
 3-0 Mathias Woxlin 
 Helsingborg-Hammarby 5-1
 1-0 Christoffer Andersson 
 2-0 Henrik Larsson 
 3-0 Hannu Patronen 
 3-1 Charlie Davies 
 4-1 Henrik Larsson 
 5-1 Roman Kienast 
 IFK Norrköping-Helsingborg 3-4
 0-1 Rasmus Jönsson 
 0-2 Isaac Chansa 
 0-3 Rasmus Jönsson 
 1-3 Kevin Amuneke 
 2-3 Daniel Bamberg 
 2-4 Roman Kienast 
 3-4 Mikael Roth 
 Helsingborg-Kalmar FF 1-0
 1-0 Henrik Larsson 
 Malmö FF-Helsingborg 1-2
 1-0 Edward Ofere 
 1-1 Henrik Larsson 
 1-2 Rasmus Jönsson 
 Helsingborg-Elfsborg 2-2
 1-0 René Makondele 
 2-0 Henrik Larsson 
 2-1 Teddy Lučić 
 2-2 Fredrik Berglund 
 Örebro-Helsingborg 3-1
 0-1 Roman Kienast 
 1-1 Sebastian Henriksson 
 2-1 Kim Olsen 
 3-1 Roni Porokara 
 Helsingborg-Trelleborg 1-1
 0-1 Andreas Drugge 
 1-1 Christoffer Andersson 
 GAIS-Helsingborg 0-3
 0-1 René Makondele 
 0-2 René Makondele 
 0-3 Tobias Holmqvist 
 AIK-Helsingborg 3-1
 1-0 Miran Burgič 
 2-0 Miran Burgič 
 3-0 Gabriel Özkan 
 3-1 Tobias Holmqvist 
 Helsingborg-IFK Göteborg 2-1
 1-0 Patrik Åström 
 1-1 Niclas Alexandersson 
 2-1 Henrik Larsson

Topscorers
  Henrik Larsson 14
  Christoffer Andersson 8
  René Makondele 6
  Marcus Lantz 3
  Rasmus Jönsson 3
  Isaac Chansa 3

Helsingborgs IF seasons
2008 in Swedish football